National Secondary Route 127, or just Route 127 (or ) is a National Road Route of Costa Rica, located in the Heredia province.

Description
In Heredia province the route covers Santa Bárbara canton (Santa Bárbara, Purabá districts).

References

Highways in Costa Rica